Ephippiger provincialis, the Provence saddle-backed bush cricket, is a species in the family Tettigoniidae.

Description
The body is light brown or reddish colored, very rarely green. The very short and wide cerci of the males have a tooth inside that is equally long and wide like the tooth at the end. All other species of the tribe Ephippigerini have a much smaller such tooth. The nearly straight Ovipositor is rarely shorter than 25 millimeters.

Distribution
Ephippiger provincialis is endemic to southern France. It occurs between Saint-Tropez and Marseille.

Mode of life
The specimens sit usually on the ground or on low plants. Adult specimens can be found from June to August. Sometimes mass reproductions happen by this species.

References

provincialis
Endemic insects of Metropolitan France
Insects described in 1854
Orthoptera of Europe